Pseudomicrargus is a genus of East Asian sheet weavers that was first described by K. Y. Eskov in 1992.

Species
 it contains three species:
Pseudomicrargus acuitegulatus (Oi, 1960) (type) – Japan
Pseudomicrargus asakawaensis (Oi, 1964) – Japan
Pseudomicrargus latitegulatus (Oi, 1960) – Japan

See also
 List of Linyphiidae species (I–P)

References

Araneomorphae genera
Linyphiidae
Spiders of Asia